Chaumont Grange Hall and Dairymen's League Building is a historic grange hall located at Chaumont in Jefferson County, New York. It was built in 1898 and is a -story, three by four bay frame building on a foundation of limestone and concrete blocks.

It was listed on the National Register of Historic Places in 1990.

References

Grange organizations and buildings in New York (state)
Grange buildings on the National Register of Historic Places in New York (state)
Cultural infrastructure completed in 1898
Buildings and structures in Jefferson County, New York
National Register of Historic Places in Jefferson County, New York